The Mountain Region is one of ten United States regions that currently send teams to the Little League World Series, the largest youth baseball competition in the world. The region was created in 2022 when the LLWS was expanded from 16 teams (eight U.S. teams and eight "International" teams from the rest of the world) to 20 teams (ten U.S. and ten International).

The Mountain Region is made up of four states.

Regional Championship

The list below lists each state's participant in the Mountain Little League Region Tournament. That year's winner is indicated in green.

2022–present

LLWS results
As of the 2022 Little League World Series.

Results by state
As of the 2022 Little League World Series.

References

North
Sports in the Western United States
Baseball competitions in the United States
2022 establishments in the United States
Recurring sporting events established in 2022